The seventh and final season of the television comedy series Boy Meets World aired between September 24, 1999 and May 5, 2000, on ABC in the United States. The season was produced by Michael Jacobs Productions and Touchstone Television with series creator Michael Jacobs as executive producer. It was broadcast as part of the ABC comedy block TGIF on Friday evenings.

The storyline of Cory, Topanga, Shawn, and Eric moving to New York, established in the series finale, continues on in the sequel series Girl Meets World (2014–2017) where Cory and Topanga are shown to be raising their two children, Riley (Rowan Blanchard) and Auggie (August Maturo). Riley is the series' protagonist, with Cory as a co-lead, and Topanga in a reduced role. Shawn and Eric appear in recurring guest roles, as do many other characters that have appeared over the course of Boy Meets World's run.

Cast 
 

Ben Savage as Cory Matthews
William Daniels as George Feeny 
Betsy Randle as Amy Matthews 
Will Friedle as Eric Matthews
Rider Strong as Shawn Hunter
Danielle Fishel as Topanga Matthews (née Lawrence) 
Lindsay Ridgeway as Morgan Matthews 
Trina McGee-Davis as Angela Moore 
Maitland Ward as Rachel McGuire 
Matthew Lawrence as Jack Hunter 
William Russ as Alan Matthews

Episodes

Notes

References

External links
 

1999 American television seasons
2000 American television seasons
7